The 2017 film Justice League had a troubled production history. Its script and photography underwent major changes both before and during production, and there was a change in directors. This resulted in the theatrical release of a version that was markedly different from how the film had been conceived of during pre-production and principal photography.

Most of the changes were driven by the negative reception of the previous installments of the DC Extended Universe (DCEU) Batman v Superman: Dawn of Justice and Suicide Squad. Justice League had been directed by Zack Snyder through most of its production, but Snyder stepped down in May 2017 during post-production following the death of his daughter, and Joss Whedon took over at that point, completing the film as an uncredited co-director. Whedon oversaw script rewrites, reshoots and other changes that added a brighter tone and more humor to the film, and cut the runtime down to 120 minutes in accordance with a mandate from Warner Bros. Pictures. The theatrical release of Justice League was a commercial failure, and was met with a mixed reception from critics and audiences, leading Warner Bros. to re-evaluate the future of the DCEU.

When details surfaced about the film's troubled production and the state of the film before Snyder stepped down, some expressed interest in the idea of releasing an alternate cut that would be more faithful to Snyder's vision for the film. Fans of Snyder's works, members of the cast and crew, and other film industry figures petitioned for the release of this "Snyder Cut". At the time, Warner stated that they had no plans to release an alternate cut of Justice League. However, on May 20, 2020, Zack Snyder personally confirmed that it would be released on HBO Max as Zack Snyder's Justice League during a watch party for Man of Steel. The film was released on March 18, 2021.

Original Snyder/Terrio script (2014–2016) 
Following the release of Man of Steel (2013), director Zack Snyder outlined the basis of the DC Extended Universe (DCEU), which centered around a five-film arc including Man of Steel, Batman v Superman and a Justice League trilogy. As interpreted by Stephen M. Colbert of Screen Rant, the structure of the franchise would have been the "inverse" of the Marvel Cinematic Universe. Instead of solo films culminating in cross-over Avengers films, DC's take would have primarily been cross-over films with occasional solo films on the side set at different points in time. Snyder's original vision for the series was to have Batman v Superman be one of the darkest in the franchise, and have the films become more hopeful in tone from there. Despite this, Snyder describes his original Justice League script written with Chris Terrio as "dark" and "scary". According to concept art, the scenes involving Apokolips and the New Gods were heavily influenced by sci-fi and the work of H. R. Giger.

According to Snyder, at least part of the film was set to explore Bruce Wayne's "Knightmare"—the scene in Batman v Superman where Bruce Wayne has a vision of a post-apocalyptic future Gotham, followed by the Flash appearing to tell him that Lois Lane is "key" and worries that he is "too soon". In the early script for Justice League, the continuation of the "Knightmare" had Darkseid use a boom tube to teleport into the Batcave and kill Lois Lane. This would have made Superman susceptible to Darkseid's Anti-Life Equation, the fictional mathematical formula from the comic books for controlling the minds of sentient beings. With Superman under Darkseid's control, they take over Earth and create the post-apocalyptic future from Wayne's "Knightmare". Batman and Cyborg worked together to create a time machine to send Flash back in time to save Lois and prevent Superman from falling under Darkseid's control. The Flash has two possible destinations in time, one of which resulted in his "too soon" speech in Batman v Superman. This version of Justice League was never filmed and no footage of it exists. However, scenes of Superman mourning the corpse of Lois after Darkseid kills her did eventually end up in Zack Snyder's Justice League, as visions that Cyborg has before the Justice League resurrects Superman.

The "Snyder Cut" (2016–2017) 
Batman v Superman: Dawn of Justice received generally negative reviews from critics (holding a 29% approval rating and an average rating of 4.94 out of 10 on Rotten Tomatoes), while audiences gave the film a mixed reception (holding a "B" rating with CinemaScore). Common critiques of the film centered around its dark tone, lack of humor and slow pace. This reaction caused Warner Bros. Pictures and Snyder to re-evaluate upcoming films in the DCEU, particularly Suicide Squad, which had already wrapped principal photography, and Justice League, which was a month away from filming. Snyder and Terrio had always planned on having the DCEU films become progressively lighter and more positive in tone, but the reaction to Batman v Superman caused them to rewrite Justice League as even more hopeful in tone than originally planned. In cinematographer Fabian Wagner's first meeting with Snyder, he said he wanted to "get away from the stylized, desaturated, super-high contrast looks of other films in the franchise."

Warner hired Jon Berg and Geoff Johns to oversee the DCEU, with their first task being to help with Justice League rewrites to make the film more hopeful and optimistic. Batman actor Ben Affleck was hired to help with script re-writes and also serve as executive producer on Justice League, mainly to ensure continuity between the film and The Batman, which he was expected to star in and direct at the time. Jeremy Irons, the actor who portrayed Alfred Pennyworth and was an outspoken critic of Batman v Superman, said the "Snyder Cut" script was simpler, smaller and more linear than its predecessor. The rewrites also resulted in a month delay of shooting for Justice League as it began in May instead of April as initially planned. Principal photography was shot entirely using 35 mm film and wrapped in December 2016. Months later, multiple cuts of Snyder's Justice League were shown to Warner executives, in addition to friends and family of Snyder. A final run-time and picture lock were achieved, though the cuts had incomplete VFX shots and partial audio mixing. Composer Tom Holkenborg completed his score for the film before stepping down. During an event, Snyder said that he had multiple cuts that were essentially "done", only needing "a few CG tweaks" to complete, but that it was ultimately up to Warner to release it. Forbes contributor and film screenwriter Mark Hughes reported that the cut was more than 90% complete, while The Telegraph cited a VFX expert as estimating that the studio would need another $30–40 million to finish the film. This mostly finished version of Justice League is what is often referred to as the "Snyder Cut". Citing several members of Justice Leagues crew "at various levels" as his source, Kevin Smith described the state of the cut, saying:

"When people hear 'Snyder Cut' in their heads, they think about, like, a DVD they've seen of an extended cut or something that's finished. The 'Snyder Cut' that, again I haven't seen, but the one I've heard everyone speak of was never a finished film. It was a movie that people in production could watch and fill in the blanks. It was certainly not meant for mass consumption."

The "Snyder Cut" is 214 minutes (about three-and-a-half hours) while the assembly cut was nearly five hours long. The basic framework of Snyder's Justice League story was largely maintained for the theatrical release: Batman and Wonder Woman seek out the other metahumans, form a team, resurrect Superman, and defeat Steppenwolf in a final battle in Russia. However, dozens of additional scenes, backstories, mythos, worldbuilding elements, new characters, and teases for upcoming films were present in the "Snyder Cut" but not the theatrical release. The time-travel aspect of Snyder and Terrio's original draft was maintained for the "Snyder Cut", but on a smaller scale. In this version, Cyborg fails to stop "The Unity" and Flash travels back in time to give him a second chance. It spent more time introducing the three new main characters to the DCEU: Flash, Aquaman, and Cyborg. The "Snyder Cut" also introduced several new supporting characters from the source comic books, including: Justice League antagonist Darkseid (played by Ray Porter), master torturer Desaad (played by Peter Guinness), Aquaman's mentor Nuidis Vulko (played by Willem Dafoe), scientist Ryan Choi who takes on the mantle of Atom in the comics (played by Ryan Zheng), Cyborg's mother Elinore Stone (played by Karen Bryson), Barry Allen's love interest Iris West (played by Kiersey Clemons), and the shapeshifting alien Martian Manhunter (played by Harry Lennix). Other side characters had additional screen time and more important roles in the "Snyder Cut", including: Superman antagonist Lex Luthor (played by Jesse Eisenberg), Cyborg's father Silas Stone (played by Joe Morton), Atlantean warrior Mera (played by Amber Heard), reporter and Superman love interest Lois Lane (played by Amy Adams), and Wonder Woman antagonist Ares (played by Nick McKinless).

Warner executives who saw his cut noted that Snyder made significant efforts to lighten the tone following the criticism of Batman v Superman, but thought it did not have enough humor. After the release of Aquaman, while the film was lighter than the anticipated tone from the "Snyder Cut" the character of Aquaman was said to be more consistent with Snyder's depiction than it was with Joss Whedon's. Despite this, Warner was still unhappy with the results and insider reports said sources in Warner Bros. considered the cut "unwatchable". The first two trailers for Justice League used footage from the "Snyder Cut" before Whedon's contributions, and were subject to a mixed reception. Neil Daly, who oversaw the test screenings, said test audiences ranked Batman and Superman the lowest of the main cast. However, one of the editors for the film, David Brenner, claimed Warner Bros. never screened Snyder's cut to any test audience back in 2017 after a shortened 2 and a half hour rough cut was assumed as not funny enough by executives. They then started interviewing writers to see who could be hired on to help inject humor. In July 2018, The Wall Street Journal reported that Warner had no plans of releasing an alternate cut of Justice League. In November 2019, both The Hollywood Reporter and Variety independently reported Warner had no plans to release the "Snyder Cut", with the latter quoting an inside source as saying, "That's a pipe dream. There's no way it's ever happening."

#ReleaseTheSnyderCut movement 

Immediately after the theatrical release of Justice League, fans created an online petition to release the "Snyder Cut" that gained more than 180,000 signatures. The movement, which uses the hashtag #ReleaseTheSnyderCut on social media, began before fans had any knowledge that a cut of Snyder's Justice League film actually existed in any capacity. The movement was ignited by the divisive reaction toward the theatrical cut, knowing that Snyder left directorial duties and the final cut of the film in the hands of Joss Whedon and the assumption that Whedon created an inferior film. The circumstances have been compared to a similar situation with the film Superman II (1980). Both Justice League and Superman II feature a director that was replaced, for different reasons, before completion of a film, which led to a second director coming in and making substantial changes to the tone of each film. Although the reasoning behind each director's departure differs, Richard Donner was able to complete his Superman II cut in 2006. Some assumed that an alternate cut of Justice League was inevitable because historically several of Snyder's films have been re-released as extended cuts for home media (Watchmen, Batman v Superman: Dawn of Justice) which are seen by some critics as superior to the original version.

Outline of Snyder's cancelled Justice League sequels 

Scripts for two sequels to follow Snyder's Justice League were never written and never had writers assigned to them, but Snyder had a plan for their stories and comic-book artist Jim Lee drew breakdown boards for them. Production was expected to begin shortly after the release of Justice League, but work on the first sequel, tentatively titled Justice League: Part Two  was stopped when Snyder stepped down in May 2017 and was pushed back indefinitely in December 2017 in favor of a stand-alone Batman film titled The Batman starring Ben Affleck, which similarly never came to fruition and was converted into a separate, standalone project entirely. After the commercial flop of Justice League caused Warner to re-think their DCEU strategy and move away from Snyder's vision, Snyder and members of the cast and crew slowly began leaking details about his Justice League trilogy plan. Those details include:
 After being teased in Zack Snyder's Justice League, Darkseid would have been the main villain of Justice League Part Two.
 The "Knightmare" would have been important to the plot. Snyder's plans for the "Knightmare" future and beyond were loosely inspired by the plot of the 2013 video game Injustice: Gods Among Us and Grant Morrison's 2008-2009 DC crossover storyline "Final Crisis" and Geoff Johns' DC crossover storyline "Flashpoint".
 Justice League Part Two would have featured the fall of Earth and its terraformation into a copy of Apokolips as teased by Cyborg's vision of "the future" in Zack Snyder's Justice League. Darkseid would've killed Lois Lane in the Batcave while Batman himself would've been unable to stop him, ultimately making Superman susceptible to the Anti-Life Equation through his grief, resulting in his corruption and eventual alliance with the forces of Apokolips as Earth's tyrant ruler. This would have forced the Flash—the only survivor of an attack by the evil Superman, to escape through time travel using a cosmic treadmill built by Cyborg. This plot device was also alluded to in the events of Batman v. Superman: Dawn of Justice, during which Barry Allen, presumed to be from the "Knightmare" future, broke through time to warn the present Wayne about Superman's impending threat to the planet before realizing he went back "too soon" for Bruce to understand what he was referring to.
 Following a now cut ending scene from Zack Snyder's Justice League, which originally featured Green Lanterns John Stewart, Kilowog and Tomar-Re, later repurposed to Stewart and Martian Manhunter before being reworked to solely involve the latter, members of the Green Lantern Corps were expected to appear in Justice League Part Two including Hal Jordan. Producer Charles Roven was rumored to be interested in having Mark Wahlberg play The Corps' most famous member, though he was never officially cast in the role. In earlier scrapped ideas from 2014 to 2015, of Justice League Part 2 and Part 2A, Hal Jordan would have been introduced in the final Justice League film set in the "Knightmare" timeline. By 2016, with those ideas having been partly scrapped and altered, it seems plans changed for Hal to also appear a bit earlier in Justice League 2 alongside the Green Lantern Corps.
 According to Snyder, the scene in Batman v Superman with crosses over Superman's dead body was a cryptic reference to events in Justice League 2.
 Snyder planned to flesh out the past story between Batman and the Joker in Justice League Part Two by exploring how Robin died, including flashbacks of how the Joker murdered Dick Grayson before burning down Wayne Manor and confronting Batman. The way this sequence would have gone was that there was a last supper-inspired moment with the resistance in which they all tell each other stories, as they believe they are going to die the following day, with the Joker's story being of how he killed Robin. Snyder said the fight sequence would have been shown on screen, as Robin "does [not] go down without a fight".
 While on the set of Star Wars: The Rise of Skywalker at Pinewood Studios—where Justice League was also created—Kevin Smith met with some of the crew who worked on Snyder's films and learned about what the future would have held. He revealed that Justice League 2 was supposed to end in defeat, comparing it to the films The Empire Strikes Back and Avengers: Infinity War.
 Also according to Smith, Justice League 3 would have been set entirely in the post-apocalyptic "Knightmare" Earth seen in Bruce Wayne's dream sequences in Batman v Superman and Zack Snyder's Justice League, with a rough synopsis of it being, "The heroes' last stand against Darkseid and the forces of Apokolips". Conversely, Snyder later stated that it would have been Justice League Part Two that was set in the post-apocalyptic "Knightmare" Earth.
 Justice League 3 would have featured a time-traveling Flash avert the apocalyptic future by preventing Superman's fall into darkness, travelling back to the events of Part Two where it would've been revealed that Lois Lane was pregnant with a child, and that Bruce Wayne was the father. As a result, Batman was to sacrifice himself to save Lois from Darkseid, resulting in Superman becoming the leader of the Justice League and the central character of the film.
 Following Batman's sacrifice, Superman would've reverted to his classic suit, completing his 5-6 film character arc as intended by Snyder since Man of Steel by uniting mankind and other armies around the Earth once more for the upcoming showdown against Darkseid and his Apokoliptian forces, including aircraft carriers, United States Army Special Forces members, Atlanteans led by Aquaman rising out of the ocean, Amazons led by Wonder Woman coming off Themyscira, and even the Green Lantern Corps. Hippolyta would have died in the war, with Diana succeeding her as queen of the Amazons. Aquaman would have united all the kingdoms of the sea and be recognized as their true king for uniting with the surface world. Sometime after the war, the Amazons would open up Themyscira to the rest of the world again. Meanwhile, Barbara Gordon, who would've been introduced to Snyder's story arc in the Ben Affleck-directed The Batman, would replace her father as Commissioner of the Gotham City Police Department upon his retirement, and would've assumed Batman's crimefighting duties as Batgirl, until the powerless son of Superman and Lois became the new Batman 20 years later.

In January 2019, Snyder released a T-shirt as a reward for donating to a crowdfunding campaign, with all proceeds going toward the American Foundation for Suicide Prevention. His design, which resembles the Kabbalah Tree of Life, is said to contain the plot of his five-film arc including a planned Justice League trilogy within a mosaic of cryptic symbols and phrases. The reverse side of the shirt has a quote from Joseph Campbell, American literature professor famed for his creation of the Hero's journey, which reads: "All the gods, all the heavens, all the hells, are within you". The Dreamscapes Of Zack Snyder's Justice League Exhibition in downtown Dallas revealed an outline for Justice League Parts 2 and 2A by Snyder, lettered by Geoff Johns, and with art by Jim Lee; it showed costumes and props that were used in the additional photography for Zack Snyder's Justice League.

Current status
In February 2021, Snyder stated that as far as he knew, Warner Bros. had no interest in hiring him for further Justice League sequels or any DCEU films overall. Snyder revealed at Justice Con 2021 that he had cast Wayne T. Carr as John Stewart / Green Lantern and filmed footage with him for the film's epilogue but was turned down by the studio.

Theatrical cut (2017) 

After disapproving of the direction of the "Snyder Cut", Warners and Geoff Johns hired filmmaker Joss Whedon to re-write the script and help with extensive re-shoots. (However, he may have been hired earlier than reported, to join a larger writer's room.) Whedon had gone to Warner Bros. with a pitch for a Batgirl film, to which Johns accepted his pitch and was working with him on developing that film. Johns then saw this as an opportunity to help with additional rewrites and reshoots for Justice League. Soon, the studio gave Whedon more power as he was also given power to help direct reshoots. When Snyder and his wife left the project after their daughter's death, Whedon took over as director and directed reshoots for approximately 55 days. Then-Warner CEO Kevin Tsujihara mandated that Justice League's length was not to exceed two hours, something the studio had been pushing for throughout principal photography, but Snyder himself never took seriously, saying it was near impossible to tell his story in two hours. The film company also reportedly decided not to push back the release date (which would have allowed the filmmakers more time to properly complete Justice League), partly so that executives could keep their annual bonuses, and partly because they were concerned that AT&T might dissolve the studio after an upcoming merger, which might result in the incomplete film getting scrapped altogether.

Snyder may also have turned down an offer to delay the release date. He was expected to film the scenes that Whedon re-wrote, and they were working together to fix the film in accordance with the studio's requests when Snyder's daughter, Autumn Snyder, died by suicide in March 2017. He continued to work on Justice League for two months after the tragedy to distract himself, before finally stepping down in May 2017. His wife Deborah Snyder who was producing Justice League also stepped away from the project. Some reports, however, say that Snyder may have been quietly fired from the project in January or February 2017, a month or two before his daughter's suicide and several more before his official departure from the project. Once Snyder left, Whedon assumed full control over the completion of the theatrical cut of Justice League. Warner COO Toby Emmerich said at the time:

"The directing is minimal and it has to adhere to the style and tone and the template that Zack set. We're not introducing any new characters. It's the same characters in some new scenes. He's handing the baton to Joss, but the course has really been set by Zack. I still believe that despite this tragedy, we'll still end up with a great movie."

In accordance with Warner's run-time limitations, the Justice League theatrical cut is exactly 120 minutes (two hours) long including credits. Whedon added nearly 80 new pages to the script. Wagner, who did not work on Whedon's reshoots, roughly estimates that the theatrical cut uses only about 10% of the principal photography he shot. Holkenborg had completed his score before being replaced by Danny Elfman (Spider-Man, Batman) mid-way through post-production, although he had only composed for about two hours worth of film as Warner Bros. wanted the film to be around that runtime. Recalling the situation, Holkenborg stated that he had one meeting with Whedon and decided not continue on the project due to Whedon's negative attitude towards Snyder and the film; before he could step down, he was informed that Whedon had chosen to go with Elfman anyway.

All of the re-shot scenes were filmed digitally, using an Arri Alexa XT. Wagner was briefly contacted to return, but was busy shooting another project that was being shot in the same area and briefly visited the set, finding the atmosphere very different from the original production, corroborating statements made by Ray Fisher, Jason Momoa and Gal Gadot about the experience on set of the reshoots. Wagner also said the reshoots lasted about 55 days or 7 weeks, and said the studio brightened up the color palette of the film when Snyder was working in post and went further in this with Whedon. The scenes that Whedon wrote or re-shot for the theatrical release added a brighter tone and humor, and reduced the level of violence seen in Snyder's darker direction. Fisher has also said nearly every Snyder shot scene had a Whedon addition spliced in except the scene on the GCPD roof top with the League and Commissioner Gordon. To meet the mandated run-time, more than 90 minutes of footage from the "Snyder Cut" was removed, but the result still adhered to the basic outline of the story established by Snyder. While the "Snyder Cut" was poorly received by test audiences, the early screening of Whedon's cut scored as high as Wonder Woman did with test audiences, so Warner decided to move forward with it. However, the film's editor David Brenner has since contested this.

Upon release, the theatrical cut of Justice League was met with mixed to negative reviews. Several critics described it as a "Frankenstein" film, in that similar to Frankenstein's monster that is composed of different humans' body parts, Justice League was very obviously the work of two different directors with competing visions for the finished product. Warner decided to move away from Snyder's vision for a shared universe of interconnected films and focus on stand-alone films and solo franchises instead. The previously announced sequel to Justice League scheduled for a 2019 release was pushed back indefinitely. Similar to the fallout after Batman v Superman, Warner initiated a shakeup of executives between late-2017 and mid-2018, ahead of the release of the next DCEU film, Aquaman. Both Jon Berg and Geoff Johns, who were hired as co-chairmen and co-runners of the DCEU after Batman v Superman to get the franchise back on track, departed DC Films at the end of 2017. In early 2018, Berg and Johns were replaced by Walter Hamada (It, The Conjuring) and Chantal Nong. Warner's head of casting Lora Kennedy departed in May 2018. The Hollywood Reporter quoted an insider familiar with the station as saying Hamada "walked into a shitshow, and he's trying to clean it up". Several DCEU actors are no longer attached to the franchise following Justice League, with several others currently in question.

An anonymous Warner Bros. executive stated in February 2021 that even the studio did not like the "stupefying" changes Whedon brought to Snyder's film, criticizing the Black Clad and the Russian family as goofy and pointless additions to the film. The executive affirmed that the finished film felt "awkward" because the studio did not want to admit what "piece of shit" it had become.

Significant changes to the theatrical cut 
 
The following is an overview of reported major differences between the "Snyder Cut" and the theatrical cut of Justice League. It is not an exhaustive list and dozens of other major and minor changes have been reported.

Characters removed or given a reduced presence 
The theatrical cut entirely removed at least 10 comic book characters from Snyder's original script, among others. The "Snyder Cut" included a short scene where Flash saved Iris West from a car accident. Ryan Choi / Atom appeared as a S.T.A.R. Labs scientist working with Silas Stone. Cyborg's mother Elinore Stone appeared in some flashback scenes. Aquaman's mentor Nuidis Vulko appeared in an underwater scene and a cut post-credits scene. Justice League antagonist Darkseid appeared in four different scenes. Master torturer and follower of Darkseid in the comic books Desaad played a minor role. Harry Lennix's character Calvin Swanwick from Man of Steel and Batman v Superman was planned to appear in a scene revealing he was secretly the shapeshifting alien Martian Manhunter all along. The supporting characters Silas Stone, Lex Luthor, Lois Lane, Mera, Ares, Zeus and Antiope had multiple scenes cut or reduced, but still appear in the theatrical release.

Marc McClure, the actor who played Jimmy Olsen in the Christopher Reeve Superman films, played Lois Lane's bodyguard throughout the entire "Snyder Cut" but only makes a cameo appearance in the theatrical cut. Snyder had a non-speaking cameo in a cafe. Actor Sam Benjamin said he filmed 20–30 minutes worth of scenes for a military subplot that was cut from the theatrical release.

Removal of lore and backstories for Flash, Aquaman and Cyborg 
Several scenes introducing and exploring in more depth the mythologies of the three new characters to the DCEU—Flash, Aquaman, and Cyborg—were removed from the theatrical cut. In the "Snyder Cut", Barry demonstrates the ability to reverse time by briefly surpassing the speed of light in a new version of the final battle, and his relationship with Bruce Wayne was established as being "between someone who is naive and excited and someone who is experienced and jaded." In the theatrical cut, much of this is removed or replaced by "forced jokes" and a scene in which Flash saves a Russian family during the final battle.

Cyborg was described as the "heart" of the film and the original script had included additional scenes of his origin story, learning to use his abilities and connecting with his cybernetic enhancements. Ray Fisher later voiced his displeasure with Whedon and the studio removing much of Cyborg's backstory, among other allegations, leading to a months-long feud that culminated in Whedon being investigated and Fisher leaving his role as Cyborg in 2021. Aquaman had additional scenes exploring his backstory and Atlantean lore including the Dead King of Atlantis' throne and a scene involving Vulko and Mera that directly connected to Aquaman. In November 2017, Jason Momoa defended the removal of these scenes, stating: "There was no need for it because you're going to see it in Aquaman. It's not an Aquaman movie, it's a Justice League movie."

Changes to Superman 

Most of Henry Cavill's Superman scenes were re-shot by Whedon. Cavill's reshoots were scheduled around Paramount's Mission: Impossible – Fallout, a film for which he was contractually obligated to keep his moustache. Originally, the filmmakers of the film agreed to let Cavill shave for the reshoots in exchange for 2-3 million dollars to temporarily shutdown production on Fallout. However, Paramount executives stepped in and vetoed the idea. So Warners decided to digitally remove his moustache, but under a tight deadline and the film being close to its release, the visual effects team did not have the time to properly apply the CGI; the finished product was criticized for looking awkward. Nearly all of Superman's scenes throughout the entire film feature the CGI lip, suggesting they have all been re-shot. Following the young Superman portrayed in Man of Steel and the conflicted Superman portrayed in Batman v Superman, the version of Superman that appeared in the "Snyder Cut" was described as coming closer to completing his story arc and becoming more like the "true" Superman as depicted in the comics after being reborn, and donning a black costume as opposed to the standard costume seen in the theatrical version. Superman's behavior at the end of the "Snyder Cut" in the final battle was described by storyboard artist Jay Oliva as "unhinged".

Snyder had originally intended for the hero to wear his iconic black and silver lined suit as famously first depicted in 1992's "The Death of Superman" comic storyline. However, due to the criticism of the "darkness" of Snyder's previous DC Films by critics, Warner Bros. did not allow him to use the suit since it gave the impression of a darker film - a tone they wanted to avoid. So Snyder and his visual effects team did some testing to see how easy it is to dial the color of the suit in color correction to black. They then made some slight physical alterations to the suit to make this process easier. So throughout the filming of the film, all of Superman's footage was shot in the classic suit with Snyder hoping to convince Warner Bros. in post-production to go for the black suit.

Snyder's reasoning behind using the black suit is that it resembles Superman's character more inwards, specifically his Kryptonian heritage while the blue suit resembles his role on Earth, as humanity's protector, hero, and leader. Superman choosing the black suit is an indication that his character journey is not yet complete as Snyder's originally planned vision for his DC films was a 5-6 film arc that focused on Superman with the character at the end of the arc becoming the classic iconic Superman from the comics.

Changes to Batman and Wonder Woman 
While their arcs are mainly the same in both versions of the film, many of Batman's and Wonder Woman's scenes were reshot by Whedon, including when Diana explains the first invasion of Earth to Bruce. In addition, their dynamic is changed: while Snyder's version of the film portrays Bruce and Diana with a good working relationship and subtly hints at their mutual romantic interest, Whedon introduces a subplot in the theatrical cut in which the two characters bicker constantly, which many critics saw as a borrowed element from The Avengers, which Whedon had also directed. Batman's characterization is noticeably changed, as Whedon made him more indecisive, oafish, and obsessive in the theatrical cut, whereas Snyder's original version portrayed him with newfound resolve and optimism after witnessing Superman's sacrifice in Batman v Superman.

Ben Affleck and Gal Gadot, who portrayed Batman and Wonder Woman, respectively, both voiced displeasure working with Whedon during the reshoots, and were among the most prominent supporters of the #ReleaseTheSnyderCut movement. In fact, Todd McCarthy of The Hollywood Reporter wrote in a review of the theatrical cut that Affleck "looks like he'd rather be almost anywhere else but here." Affleck's experience on the set of Justice League, especially during the reshoots, was cited as one of his reasons for stepping down from the role of Batman before he changed his mind and returned for additional shots for Zack Snyder's Justice League and The Flash. Gadot also disagreed with Whedon's choices for her character, including a controversial scene in which Flash falls on Wonder Woman's breasts, but Whedon retaliated by threatening to "make [her] look stupid" in the film. Though Gadot reported Whedon to studio executives to resolve their conflict, many of Wonder Woman's scenes and soundbytes in the final theatrical cut ultimately appear to sexually objectify her, which viewers noted was done in a similar fashion to Natasha Romanoff / Black Widow in The Avengers and its sequel Avengers: Age of Ultron. Conversely, Snyder's director's cut portrays her in a more dignified manner. In addition, both Batman's and Wonder Woman's action scenes have been restored in the "Snyder cut".

Changes to Steppenwolf 
As with Superman, many of Steppenwolf's scenes were reshot by Whedon and the character was drastically altered. Originally conceived as a monstrous, horned alien, Steppenwolf was given a more humanoid form and "cheesier" lines and was inserted in numerous scenes originally featuring Darkseid. Snyder's version of the film utilizes the character's original design, with the character speaking more "poetically" but less frequently, resulting in a more intimidating and menacing presence. Steppenwolf is also given a more complex armor capable of moving with his emotions, in addition to numerous gadgets, while his relationships with Darkseid and DeSaad are explored in-depth. While the theatrical cut seemingly portrays him like a "Saturday-morning cartoon villain", the director's cut depicts him as a tragic villain and "space knight" in similar fashion to a "fallen angel", as he is aiming to escape his role of servitude under Darkseid and regain his commander's favor.

Musical score 
The musical soundtracks of both cuts are significantly different with very little overlap. The theatrical cut was ultimately scored by Danny Elfman—this score was more orchestral and upbeat in sound to reflect the theatrical version's intention to have a lighter, more family friendly tone compared to the preceding DCEU films like Man of Steel and Batman v Superman: Dawn of Justice, both of which were scored by Hans Zimmer with assistance from Junkie XL (Tom Holkenborg). Junkie XL had been scheduled to return as composer for the theatrical cut of Justice League, but was dropped in favour of Elfman when Joss Whedon took over from Snyder in post production. For his Justice League score brought back the iconic Superman March by John Williams from the 1978 film series and also his own "The Batman Theme" originally used in the first two films of the Batman 1989 film series (which were both directed by Tim Burton and scored by Elfman) for the theatrical cut of Justice League. Elfman also reworked Zimmer's Wonder Woman theme into a more orchestral form. An excerpt from Zimmer's work on Man of Steel can be heard during the theatrical version of the film itself but is not included in the commercially released soundtrack for the theatrical cut. Elfman stated he wanted to keep things simple when scoring the film by using musical lemotifs for individual characters rather than full musical themes only developing one main theme to represent the Justice League as a whole team.

When Holkenborg was rehired by Zack Snyder to score his directors cut of the film he mostly disregarded the material Elfman had used for 2017 version as the 'Snyder Cut' would have a darker, grittier tone similar to Batman v Superman and Man of Steel on which Holkenborg had worked with Hans Zimmer and used his and Zimmer's previous DCEU work as a starting point. Holkenborg's new score overall is much less whimsical and less traditionally orchestral than Elfman's score for the theatrical version. It focuses on orchestral elements such as brass, percussion, electronica, piano, and electric guitar, similar to the approach he and Zimmer used in their previous DCEU work, in order to further emphasize the "Snyder Cut" having a similar feel to the first two DCEU films. Holkenborg also created new themes for established characters such as Batman and Wonder Woman.

Flashback to the first invasion of Earth 
The flashback scene illustrating Steppenwolf's first invasion of Earth against the Olympian Old Gods, Amazons, Atlanteans, Green Lantern Corps and humans was altered for the theatrical release. The "Snyder Cut" was longer, included a younger version of Darkseid named Uxas instead of Steppenwolf, a battle between Ares and Darkseid, additional footage of the Green Lantern Yalan Gur, and included dialogue from most of these characters that was removed from the theatrical release. When Steppenwolf strikes his axe into the ground, it creates a glowing red symbol. In the "Snyder Cut" this was explained to be a representation of the Anti-Life Equation, but the theatrical cut never addresses what the symbol is.

Final battle in Russia 
The final battle between the Justice League and Steppenwolf's army of Parademons was largely redone. Whedon added the reddish hue coloration, the root-like structures growing out of the ground, a redesign of Steppenwolf's base of operations inside the cooling tower, and the Russian family that Flash saves. The Russian family sidequest/subplot and Whedon's coloration changes are completely removed from the Snyder Cut.  Batman played a larger role in the action in the "Snyder Cut". In the theatrical cut, Steppenwolf showed fear at the prospect of defeat, causing his Parademons to attack because they are drawn to the smell of fear—a plot device Whedon introduced both in this scene and the opening scene with Batman and the burglar. In the "Snyder Cut", Wonder Woman decapitated Steppenwolf before he could escape through a boom tube and on the other side of the tube was Darkseid, teasing his appearance in a sequel. This is after The Flash (whose role was reduced in the theatrical cut) was able to reverse the Justice League's initial defeat (caused by the Mother Boxes becoming unified) by reversing time through use of the Speed Force to a point in time before the Mother Boxes synched together and terraformed the world thus giving the Justice League a second chance to prevent this from happening.

Knightmare Sequence
The Knightmare sequences in Zack Snyder's Justice League establishes that following Darkseid's victory in the hypothetical Justice League Part Two, Aquaman and Wonder Woman have died, and that Superman has turned evil following the death of Lois Lane. Batman has formed a makeshift Justice League with Flash, Cyborg, Deathstroke and Mera. In the film, Batman is mocked by the Joker for failing to save those close to him, including Robin, while also trying to form an alliance with the Justice League against Darkseid and Superman, who has turned evil following the death of Lois Lane. The scene ends with the Justice League being ambushed by Superman.

The Knightmare sequence in the epilogue was filmed by Snyder specifically for Zack Snyder's Justice League, with Affleck, Miller, Fisher, Manganiello, Heard and Leto reprising their roles from earlier installments in the DCEU; Cavill was digitally imposed into the scene using archive footage from Man of Steel and Batman v Superman: Dawn of Justice

Post-credits scene 
The post-credits scene featuring Lex Luthor and Deathstroke was initially supposed to tease Ben Affleck's original version for The Batman, in which Deathstroke would have played a pivotal role. The sequence originally filmed back in 2016 during principal photography had Deathstroke and Luthor discussing about what to do with Batman, with Luthor revealing to Deathstroke that Batman was Bruce Wayne. When Affleck stepped away from directing The Batman in January 2017 (before Matt Reeves took over as director and rewrote the film to no longer be set in the DCEU) and Joss Whedon was hired to replace Snyder a few months later, the sequence was redone with a reshoot of Jesse Eisenberg's dialogue to instead tease a planned Justice League sequel not planned by Snyder or set in his universe involving the Injustice League by rewriting Luthor's dialogue.

Another early iteration for the post-credits scene planned by Snyder had the Green Lanterns Kilowog and Tomar-Re visiting Bruce Wayne at his lake house at night to further tease the then upcoming Green Lantern Corps film and Justice League sequels. Another iteration of this was Green Lantern, clarified by Snyder to be John Stewart, visiting Bruce at the lake house. In principal photography in London, Snyder only shot half of the scene with green lights shining on Affleck, with the Green Lantern side to be filmed later. Snyder likely planned to finish the scene in pickups later in post production but left the project. When Zack Snyder's Justice League was green-lit, Snyder finished shooting the scene on his driveway at his house with actor Wayne T. Carr playing John Stewart, and also included Martian Manhunter, with the two speaking to Bruce Wayne about Darkseid, setting up Justice League sequels and the Green Lantern Corps film, instead of Kilowog and Tomar-Re. However, Warner Bros. did not like the idea of Snyder introducing John Stewart as they have their own plans for him elsewhere; a compromise was made and Snyder repurposed and reshot the scene to instead only include Martian Manhunter. Snyder also said an early idea was Ryan Reynolds (who previously portrayed Hal Jordan in the unrelated 2011 film Green Lantern) playing the "additional Lantern" in that scene but it never went beyond an idea and he never talked to Reynolds directly about it at the time.

Zack Snyder's Justice League (2021) 

On May 20, 2020, Snyder officially announced that HBO Max would be releasing his cut of Justice League as Zack Snyder's Justice League on their service on March 18, 2021. It reportedly cost more than $70 million to complete the special effects, musical score, and editing, as well as filming additional scenes with the cut also being presented in an open matte aspect ratio of 1.33:1.

Snyder stated this version is not intended to affect the future of the DCEU continuity, but that it takes place in a slightly alternate universe. Despite previous reports describing it as a mini-series, Snyder described his cut as being a four-hour movie to be viewed in "one shot."

Affleck, Fisher, Miller, Heard, and Manganiello, along with Harry Lennix and Jared Leto, returned to their respective roles for additional photography, in order to finish the project. Characters who were intended to debut in Snyder's original version of the film before their scenes were cut also appear in the film, such as Darkseid (portrayed by Ray Porter), DeSaad (portrayed by Peter Guinness), Iris West (portrayed by Kiersey Clemons), and Ryan Choi (portrayed by Zheng Kai), as well as several Green Lanterns. Sam Benjamin was part of an estimated 20–30 minutes military subplot that was cut from the 2017 theatrical release.

Notes

References

External links 
 ForSnyderCut.com – a fan-created site chronicling news and updates about the "Snyder Cut"
 Release the Snyder Cut on Know Your Meme
 Black Suit Edition on Vimeo
 'Justice League' Deleted Scenes Reveal A Much Darker Movie via ScreenGeek
 If a Snyder Cut Does Ever Release, It Might Look Different Than Fans Expect via io9

2017 in film
Justice League (film)
Justice League
DC Extended Universe